The Cucuroux Family (French: La famille Cucuroux) is a 1953 French comedy film directed by Émile Couzinet and starring Georges Rollin, Nathalie Nattier and Jean Tissier. An upper-class Frenchman's plans to marry a wealthy woman are threatened by the presence of his mistress.

Cast
 Georges Rollin as Gontran de Saint-Paul  
 Nathalie Nattier as Nita
 Jean Tissier as Marquis Aristide Cucuroux
 Pierre Larquey as Jean 
 Jeanne Fusier-Gir as Célestine  
 André Salvador as Coquelicot 
 Catherine Cheiney as Henriette 
 Yorick Royan as Geneviève de Coutville

References

Bibliography 
 Rège, Philippe. Encyclopedia of French Film Directors, Volume 1. Scarecrow Press, 2009.

External links 
 

1953 films
French comedy films
1953 comedy films
1950s French-language films
Films directed by Émile Couzinet
French black-and-white films
1950s French films